Iowa Highway 330 (Iowa 330) is a  state highway that runs northeasterly from Altoona past Albion, to just north of Marshalltown in Marshall County.  Originally the two-lane, unpaved road was numbered Iowa 88.  It became part of Iowa 64 in the 1903s and it received its current route number in 1969.  Iowa 330 is mostly a four-lane, divided expressway along much of its length.  In conjunction with U.S. Route 65 in Iowa (US 65), Iowa 14 and US 20, Iowa 330 is commonly used as a connector between Des Moines and the Waterloo–Cedar Falls area.

Route description

Iowa 330 begins at an interchange with Interstate 80 (I-80), U.S. Highway 6 (US 6), and US 65 in Altoona.  The I-80 freeway runs east–west; US 6 comes up from the southwest along Hubbell Avenue and joins eastbound I-80 while US 65 exits eastbound I-80 and turns onto Hubbell heading northeast.  For the first  of its routing, Iowa 330 shares the same roadway with US 65.  The two routes head northeast on a four-lane expressway through Bondurant and into rural Polk County.  In the northeastern corner of Polk County, the roadway breaks from its northeastern path to curve around the Engeldinger Marsh.  The routes enter Jasper County and turn back to the northeast.

US 65 leaves the Iowa 330 expressway at the intersection with Iowa 117 north of Mingo. US 65 and Iowa 117 form the northern and southern branches, respectively, of a crossroad. It intersects U.S. Highway 30 at a diamond interchange just west of Marshalltown.   later, now on a two-lane road, Iowa 330 turns north of Albion, bypassing Marshalltown to the west. On the way to Albion, Highway 330 crosses the Union Pacific Railroad main line and the Iowa River. North of Albion, Iowa 330 turns east and travels  before ending at Iowa Highway 14.

History
The highway was originally designated as Highway 330 and paved in the late 1940s. In 1969 the route was extended southwestward from US 30 to its current terminus, replacing part of Iowa 64 (this section was originally Iowa 88). In 1989, it was re-routed to bypass Marshalltown, replacing Iowa Highway 233, a spur route from Iowa 14 to Albion.

Major intersections

References

External links

330
Transportation in Polk County, Iowa
Transportation in Jasper County, Iowa
Transportation in Story County, Iowa
Transportation in Marshall County, Iowa